Encinal may refer to:
Encinal, former name of Alameda, California
 Encinal, Sutter County, California
Encinal, New Mexico, a census-designated place in Cibola County, New Mexico, United States
Encinal, Texas, a city in La Salle County, Texas, United States
Encinal County, Texas, a county in Texas, United States
Encinal High School, a public secondary school in Alameda, California, United States

See also 
Encinal Tower, a proposed skyscraper in Oakland, California